Paweł Król (born 10 December 1987) is a Polish retired footballer (defender). His former club was Górnik Zabrze. In the winter 2005/2006 he was on trial in Manchester City, however he failed the trial.

References

Polish footballers
Górnik Zabrze players
GKS Katowice players
Korona Kielce players
1987 births
Living people
Bałtyk Gdynia players
People from Bartoszyce
Sportspeople from Warmian-Masurian Voivodeship
Association football defenders